Admiral Henry Shank Hillyar CB (1819 – 3 August 1893) was a Royal Navy officer who became Senior Officer, Coast of Ireland Station.

Naval career
Born the son of Admiral James Hillyar, Hillyar became commanding officer of the corvette HMS Cadmus in May 1859, commanding officer of the ironclad warship HMS Resistance in April 1866 and commanding officer of the armoured frigate HMS Royal Oak in December 1867. He went on to be Senior Officer, Coast of Ireland Station in June 1876 before he retired in September 1878.

See also

References

1819 births
1893 deaths
Royal Navy admirals
Companions of the Order of the Bath